Arkansas Highway 12 is an east–west state highway in Northwest Arkansas. The route runs  from Oklahoma State Highway 116 near Cherokee City east to Arkansas Highway 23 near Clifty.

Route description

AR 12 begins at the Oklahoma state line at SH-116. The route runs east, crossing AR 43 before entering Gentry. AR 12 meets AR 59B (Collins Avenue) and AR 59 (Gentry Blvd.) before leaving the city. The highway continues east through Springtown and Highfill, meeting AR 264 in south Highfill. AR 12 angles north past Northwest Arkansas Regional Airport to Vaughn before meeting AR 112 and US 71B near the Bentonville Municipal Airport. AR 12 becomes concurrent with many routes for the next , crossing the Fulbright Expressway (I-49/US 62/US 71) entering Rogers.

The route runs along former US 62B before meeting AR 94 in Rogers. After this the concurrency ends, and AR 12 becomes a winding 2-lane road with several steep grades and hairpin curves around Beaver Lake. The route meets AR 303 near War Eagle and AR 127 near Clifty, when the route terminates at AR 23.

From Rogers east to Clifty, the Scenic Highway 12 East Association maintains a website which outlines various points of interest on this segment of highway. Hydrologically Arkansas Highway 12 lies within the Arkansas River catchment basin.

Major intersections
Mile markers reset at concurrencies

History

The route from Oklahoma to Rogers was originally designated as Arkansas State Road B-27 in Arkansas' initial state highway system of 1924. The route was unpaved. Upon redesignation in 1926, Arkansas Highway 12 was the major east–west route of north Arkansas, running from Oklahoma to Ash Flat via Harrison. This AR 12 was a precursor to U.S. Route 62 in Arkansas, which supplanted AR 12 almost entirely in 1930. The portion not replaced by US 62 remained AR 12, and is very similar to the present-day alignment. The routing was changed slightly in August 2010 when AR 12 replaced US 62 Business in east Rogers.

Despite no major routing changes since 1930, AR 12 has seen major change along its shoulders. Running through small mountain towns at inception, today AR 12 serves America's sixth–fastest growing metropolitan area.

See also

References

External links

012
Transportation in Benton County, Arkansas
Transportation in Madison County, Arkansas
Bentonville, Arkansas
Rogers, Arkansas
U.S. Route 62